In geometry, the great dodecicosidodecahedron (or great dodekicosidodecahedron) is a nonconvex uniform polyhedron, indexed as U61. It has 44 faces (20 triangles, 12 pentagrams and 12 decagrams), 120 edges and 60 vertices.

Related polyhedra 

It shares its vertex arrangement with the truncated great dodecahedron and the uniform compounds of 6 or 12 pentagonal prisms. It additionally shares its edge arrangement with the nonconvex great rhombicosidodecahedron (having the triangular and pentagrammic faces in common), and with the great rhombidodecahedron (having the decagrammic faces in common).

See also 
 List of uniform polyhedra

References

External links 
 

Uniform polyhedra